The 1950 Colorado A&M Aggies baseball team is a baseball team that represented Colorado State College of Agriculture and Mechanic Arts in the 1950 NCAA baseball season. They were members of the Skyline Conference and were led by third-year head coach Mark Duncan.

Don "Lefty" Straub set a single season school record with 102 strikeouts thrown.

Roster

Schedule 

! colspan=2 style="" | Regular Season
|-

|- align="center" bgcolor="#ccffcc"
|  ||  || vs  || Unknown • Unknown || 3–1 || –
|- align="center" bgcolor="#ccffcc"
|  ||  || vs Colorado State College || Unknown • Unknown || 4–1 || –
|- align="center" bgcolor="#ccffcc"
|  ||  || vs Colorado State College || Unknown • Unknown || 11–1 || –
|-

|-
! style="" | Postseason
|-

|- align="center" bgcolor="#ccffcc"
| 18 || June || vs Colorado State College || Unknown • Unknown || 8–2 || 16–2
|- align="center" bgcolor="#ccffcc"
| 19 || June || vs Colorado State College || Unknown • Unknown || 9–5 || 17–2
|-

|- align="center" bgcolor="#ffcccc"
| 20 || June 15 || vs Wisconsin || Omaha Municipal Stadium • Omaha, Nebraska || 3–7 || 17–3
|- align="center" bgcolor="#ffcccc"
| 21 || June 18 || vs Texas || Omaha Municipal Stadium • Omaha, Nebraska || 1–3 || 17–4
|-

References 

Colorado State Rams baseball seasons
Colorado State Rams baseball
College World Series seasons
Skyline Conference (1938–1962) baseball champion seasons
Colorado A&M